Sim Scanner is a feature of the Olympus FluoView FV1000 confocal laser scanning microscope. The system incorporates two laser scanners, one for confocal imaging and the other for simultaneous stimulation. They can be illuminated separately and independently, making it possible to stimulate the specimen during observation. As a result, the rapid cell reactions that occur right after laser stimulation can be  captured, making the Sim Scanner suitable for such applications as Fluorescence recovery after photobleaching (FRAP), Fluorescence loss in photobleaching (FLIP), photoactivation and photoconversion.

References
Sim Scanner in Nature Methods

Microscopes
Microscopy